Ernesto "Boy" F. Herrera (September 11, 1942 – October 29, 2015) was a Senator of the Philippines. He was a trade union leader, an advocate of law and order, and a legislator in the 8th, 9th and 10th Congresses.

Career
As senator, he is the principal author of the law that reinstated capital punishment in the Philippines on December 31, 1993. It would later be abolished on June 24, 2006 upon the implementation of Republic Act No. 9346.

Personal life
Ernesto F. Herrera was born in Samboan, Cebu, on September 11, 1942. He was married to entrepreneur, Lourdes Betia Cuico. He died in Makati City on October 29, 2015, at the age of 73, and a month before his 74th birthday.

Educational life
Zapatera Elementary School (1955)
University of the Visayas (1959)
University of the Visayas – Bachelor of Laws (1965)

Higher studies
Lyceum of the Philippines – Master's in Public Administration (1995) 
Lyceum of the Philippines – Doctor of Fiscal Studies (1998)

General history
Trade Union Congress of the Philippines – General secretary (1983–2015) 
Senator – Philippine Senate (1987–1998)
Congressman – Philippine House of Representatives (1998–2001)

Affiliations
International Labor Organization – Former consultant
Citizen's Drugwatch Foundation Inc. – Founding chairman
Carlos P. Garcia Foundation Inc. – President
Agrava Fact-Finding Board (investigated the assassination of Benigno Aquino Jr.) – Member
International Confederation of Free Trade Union – Former member, executive board
University of the Visayas Alumni Association – President
Forefront Technologies Foundation Inc. – Co-founder

References

External links
Ernesto Herrera's website

1942 births
2015 deaths
Laban ng Demokratikong Pilipino politicians
Lyceum of the Philippines University alumni
Members of the House of Representatives of the Philippines from Bohol
People from Cebu
Senators of the 8th Congress of the Philippines
Senators of the 9th Congress of the Philippines
Senators of the 10th Congress of the Philippines
University of the Visayas alumni